Jean-Claude Sozzi (born 31 October 1943) is a French former professional ice hockey goaltender. He competed in the men's tournament at the 1968 Winter Olympics.

References

External links

1943 births
Living people
French ice hockey goaltenders
Olympic ice hockey players of France
Ice hockey players at the 1968 Winter Olympics
Sportspeople from Boulogne-Billancourt
Brûleurs de Loups players
Rapaces de Gap players